The Queen Elizabeth II Silver Jubilee Medal is a commemorative medal created in 1977 to mark the 25th anniversary of Queen Elizabeth II's accession in 1952. The medal is physically identical in all realms where it was awarded, save for Canada, where it contained unique elements. As an internationally distributed award, the Queen Elizabeth II Silver Jubilee Medal holds a different place in each country's order of precedence for honours.

Basis of award and numbers awarded
The Queen Elizabeth II Silver Jubilee Medal was created by a Royal Warrant from the Queen.

Until 1977, the practice for coronation and jubilee medals was for the United Kingdom authorities to decide on a total number of medals to be produced and allocate how many were to be distributed by each Dominion and possession across the British Empire, and later, to each Commonwealth country. From 1977, the award of the medals was at the discretion of each national government. Thus, 30,000 were distributed in Britain, 1,507 in New Zealand, 6,870 in Australia, and 30,000 in Canada.

Design
The Queen Elizabeth II Silver Jubilee Medal in the UK was designed by David Wynne. It is in the form of a  diameter silver disc with, on the obverse, the words ELIZABETH II DEI GRA. REGINA FID. DEF. (Latin abbreviation for "Elizabeth II, by the Grace of God, Queen, Defender of the Faith") surrounding an effigy of Queen Elizabeth II, symbolising her role as fount of honour. On the reverse is a crown atop a wreath that contains the words THE 25th YEAR OF THE REIGN OF QUEEN ELIZABETH II 6 February 1977 in six lines.

The Canadian version has a number of differences, with the medal slightly thicker and the crown on the Queen's effigy more upright. The reverse has a distinct design, and bears a stylised maple leaf with CANADA above and the Royal Cypher below, flanked with the dates 1952 and 1977.

Women may wear the medal near the left shoulder with the ribbon tied in a bow. Like the Police Long Service and Good Conduct Medal and Queen's Police Medal, ribbon bars are also available. The medal, which came with a certificate, was awarded unnamed.

Eligibility and allocation
The Canadian medal was intended to award individuals who had been deemed to have made a significant contribution to their fellow citizens, their community or to Canada. So that all regions of the country would be recognised equally, the federal, provincial, and civic governments all forwarded names to Rideau Hall, as did private organisations in the fields of the arts, sports, philanthropy, and charity. The full membership of the Order of Canada and Order of Military Merit, as well as all recipients of Canadian Bravery Decorations received the Queen Elizabeth II Silver Jubilee Medal automatically, while for members of the Canadian Forces, merit with length of service and prestige of current appointment was considered.

The 30,000 medals awarded within the United Kingdom included 9,000 to armed forces personnel, with others given to members of the Royal Household and to people engaged in a wide range of activities, including industry, trade, local services, voluntary work, the arts, entertainment and sport.

Precedence
Some orders of precedence are as follows:

Notable recipients

Cook Islands
The following list includes notable Cook Islanders who received the Queen Elizabeth II Silver Jubilee Medal, and is not an exhaustive list of recipients.

 Inatio Akaruru
 Albert Henry
 Geoffrey Henry
 Margaret Makea Karika Ariki
 Ngatupuna Matepi
 Tiakana Numanga
 Pa Tepaeru Terito Ariki
 Raui Pokoati
 Ngereteina Puna
 Pupuke Robati
 Ada Rongomatane Ariki
 Marguerite Story
 Tangaroa Tangaroa
 Vainerere Tangatapoto
 Tararo Jane Ariki
 Joe Williams

New Zealand
The following list includes notable New Zealanders who received the Queen Elizabeth II Silver Jubilee Medal, and is not an exhaustive list of recipients.

A
 Lance Adams-Schneider
 Colin Aikman
 Neil Anderson
 Basil Arthur
 Brian Ashby
 Rex Austin

B
 Ron Bailey
 Harry Barker
 Jim Barnes
 Mary Batchelor
 David Beattie
 Bruce Beetham
 Bob Bell
 Manuhuia Bennett
 Bill Birch
 Philip Blakeley
 Paddy Blanchfield
 June Blundell
 Jim Bolger
 Ted Bollard
 Richard Bolt
 Ray Boord
 Betty Bourke
 Vivienne Boyd
 Whitford Brown
 Malcolm Burns

C
 Maurice Casey
 Lester Castle
 George Chapman
 Val Chapman
 Muir Chilwell
 Gordon Christie
 Fraser Colman
 Ken Comber
 Mick Connelly
 Robin Cooke
 Warren Cooper
 Assid Corban
 Frank Corner
 Merv Corner
 Anthony Cottrell
 Ben Couch

D
 Harry Dansey
 Ronald Davison
 Graham Davy
 Miriam Dell
 Richard Dell
 Colleen Dewe
 Gaven Donne
 Roger Douglas
 Pat Downey
 Gavin Downie
 Stewart Duff
 Eddie Durie

E
 John Elliott
 Keith Elliott
 Brian Elwood
 Jonathan Elworthy
 Dean Eyre

F
 Bob Fenton
 Dick Fickling
 Martyn Finlay
 Ray Forster
 Michael Fowler
 Laurie Francis
 Bill Fraser
 Dorothy Fraser
 Warren Freer
 Tony Friedlander

G
 George Gair
 Audrey Gale
 Les Gandar
 Frank Gill
 Peter Gordon
 Eric Gowing
 Laurence Greig

H
 Eric Halstead
 Sid Harling
 Richard Harrison
 Ken Haslett
 Ronald Hassett
 Trevor Hatherton
 Hamish Hay
 James Henare
 Trevor Henry
 Jean Herbison
 Charles Hervey
 Allan Highet
 Jack Hinton
 Patu Hohepa
 Eric Holland
 Grace Hollander
 Frank Holmes
 Keith Holyoake
 Norma Holyoake
 Judith Hornabrook
 Clive Hulme
 Jack Hunn
 Jonathan Hunt
 Te Reo Hura

I
 Trevor Inch
 Eddie Isbey

J
 Roy Jack
 Ossie Jackson
 Ewan Jamieson
 Clyde Jeffery
 John Jeffries
 Alan Johns
 Allen Johnston
 Dail Jones
 Norman Jones

K
 John Kavanagh
 John Keaney
 David Kear
 Reginald Keeling
 Hamish Keith
 Mervyn Kemp
 John Kennedy-Good
 Herb King
 Arthur Kinsella
 John Kirk
 Ruth Kirk
 John Kneebone
 Jim Knox

L
 George Laking
 Bill Lambert
 Harry Lapwood
 Tom Larkin
 Graham Latimer
 Ed Latter
 Harry Laurent
 Ray La Varis
 Ian Lawrence
 Kevan Lawrence
 Leonard Leary
 Graeme Lee
 Graham Lintott
 John Lithgow
 Charles Philip Littlejohn
 Tom Logan
 Jack Luxton

M
 Brian MacDonell
 John Mackey
 Peter Mahon
 Colin Maiden
 Aussie Malcolm
 Peter Mann
 Leo Manning
 Jack Marshall
 Russell Marshall
 Gordon Mason
 John Mathison
 Laurel McAlister
 John McAlpine
 Thaddeus McCarthy
 Terry McCombs
 Allan McCready
 Alan McCulloch
 David McGee
 Alister McIntosh
 Duncan MacIntyre
 Don McKay
 Colin McLachlan
 Jim McLay
 Roy McLennan
 Colin McLeod (engineer)
 Duncan McMullin
 Dot McNab
 Patrick Millen
 F. Russell Miller
 Holmes Miller
 Mike Minogue
 Rex Morpeth
 Ian Morrison
 Thea Muldoon
 Bill Mumm
 Lee Murdoch

N
 Gray Nelson
 Doris Nicholson
 Edward Norman
 Merv Norrish
 Alfred North

O
 Gerald O'Brien
 Patrick O'Dea
 Frank O'Flynn
 Joe Ongley
 John Ormond
 Elizabeth Orr
 Phillip O'Shea

P
 Denis Pain
 Whatumoana Paki
 Les Pearce
 Clifford Perry
 Brian Poananga
 Lindsay Poole
 Guy Powles
 Richard Prebble
 Alfred Preece
 Mervyn Probine
 Allan Pyatt

Q
 Derek Quigley
 Peter Quilliam

R
 Athol Rafter
 Matiu Rata
 Paul Reeves
 Bill Renwick
 Aroha Reriti-Crofts
 Paraone Reweti
 Winston Reynolds
 Clifford Richmond
 John Robertson
 Dove-Myer Robinson
 John Robson
 John Rodgers
 Frank Rogers
 Mary Ronnie
 Bill Rowling
 Glen Rowling
 Ron Russell
 Frank Ryan

S
 Laurie Salas
 Leo Schultz
 Ian Shearer
 Pat Sheehan
 Max Short
 Larry Siegert
 Cliff Skeggs
 Tom Skinner
 George Smith
 Edward Somers
 Jack Somerville
 Graham Speight
 Ron Spriggs
 Bert Stanley
 Marcel Stanley
 Brian Stevenson
 Alan Stewart
 Roy Stoneham
 Jack Sullivan
 Denis Sutherland
 Peter Sutton
 Mira Szászy

T
 Rob Talbot
 Brian Talboys
 Peter Tapsell
 Nicholas Tarling
 Danny Taylor
 Somerford Teagle
 Te Atairangikaahu
 Hugh Templeton
 Fred Thomas
 Ken Thomas
 David Thomson
 Robert Thomson
 Leonard Thornton
 Whetu Tirikatene-Sullivan
 Bob Tizard
 David Tompkins
 Peter Trapski
 Jim Traue
 Leonard Trent
 Ron Trotter
 Doug Truman
 Graham Turbott
 Alexander Turner
 Frederick Turnovsky

U
 Charles Upham

V
 Adrienne von Tunzelmann

W
 Bert Walker
 Ranginui Walker
 Gerry Wall
 Augusta Wallace
 John Wallace
 Richard Walls
 Bob Walton
 Arthur Ward
 Marilyn Waring
 David Watt
 Hugh Watt
 Jim Weir
 Merv Wellington
 Koro Wētere
 John White
 Bob White
 Lloyd White
 Richard White
 Richard Wild
 Peter Wilkinson
 David Williams
 Rob Williams
 Robin Williams
 Ormond Wilson
 Owen Woodhouse

Y
 Gavin Yates
 Bill Young
 Trevor Young
 Venn Young

Niue
The following list includes notable Niueans who received the Queen Elizabeth II Silver Jubilee Medal, and is not an exhaustive list of recipients.

 Enetama Lipitoa
 Frank Lui
 Lapati Paka
 Patricia Rex
 Robert Rex
 Sam Pata Emani Tagelagi
 Pope Talagi
 Young Vivian

See also
 Queen Elizabeth II Coronation Medal
 Queen Elizabeth II Golden Jubilee Medal
 Queen Elizabeth II Diamond Jubilee Medal
 Queen Elizabeth II Platinum Jubilee Medal

References

External links
Queen Elizabeth II Silver Jubilee Medal at Canada.ca
Queen's Silver Jubilee Medal at pmtranscripts.pmc.gov.au

Civil awards and decorations of Australia
Civil awards and decorations of Canada
Civil awards and decorations of New Zealand
Civil awards and decorations of the United Kingdom
Medal
Awards established in 1977